The 4th Annual Premios Juventud (Youth Awards) were broadcast by Univision on July 19, 2007.

Arraivals
 Aarón Díaz
 Alacranes Musical
 Alejandro Fernández
 Alfonso Herrera
 Anahí
 Ana Layevska
 Angélica Vale
 Aventura
 Belinda
 Beto Cuevas
 Camila
 Carlos Calderón
 Cristian Castro
 Cristian Chavez
 Christopher von Uckermann
 Daddy Yankee
 David Bisbal
 Dayanara Torres
 Don Omar
 Dulce Maria
 Enrique Iglesias
 Fanny Lu
 Frankie J
 Juan Luis Guerra
 Héctor el Father
 Ivy Queen
 Jaime Camil
 Los Super Reyes
 Luny Tunes
 Maite Perroni
 Mochy & Alessandra
 Rafael Amaya
 Rbd
 Sara Maldonado
 Toby Love
 Víctor Manuelle
 Wisin & Yandel
 Zion

Performers
The following is a list of musical artists in order of performance:
 Cruz Martínez & Los Super Reyes performed Muévelo
 Daddy Yankee performed Impacto and Ella Me Levanto
 Fanny Lu performed No te pido flores
 Wisin & Yandel and Don Omar performed No Sé De Ella MySpace and Nadie Como Tu
 Aventura performed Mi Corazoncito
 David Bisbal performed Amar Es Lo Que Quiero and Torre de Babel
 Belinda performed Bella Traicion
 RBD performed Bésame Sin Miedo

Music Category

The Perfect Combo
 Bendita Tu Luz - Maná featuring Juan Luis Guerra
 No, No, No - Thalía featuring Anthony "Romeo" Santos
 Noche de Entierro - Wisin & Yandel, Daddy Yankee, Héctor el Father, Tony Tun-Tun & Zion
 Te Lo Agradezco, Pero No - Alejandro Sanz featuring Shakira
 Torre de Babel - Wisin & Yandel featuring David Bisbal

My Favorite Video
 Angelito - Don Omar
 Celestial - RBD
 Noche de Entierro - Wisin & Yandel, Daddy Yankee, Héctor el Father, Tony Tun-Tun & Zion
 No, No, No - Thalía featuring Anthony "Romeo" Santos
 Ser o Parecer - RBD

Best Moves
 Anahí
 Chayanne
 David Bisbal
 Dulce María
 Shakira

Favorite Mexican Artist
 Alejandro Fernández
 Alicia Villarreal
 Intocable
 Jenni Rivera
 Pepe Aguilar

Voice of the Moment
 Aventura
 David Bisbal
 RBD
 Yuridia
 Wisin & Yandel

Favorite Pop Star
 David Bisbal
 Luis Fonsi
 RBD
 Shakira
 Thalía

Catchiest Tune
 Celestial - RBD
 Como Yo Nadie Te Ha Amado - Yuridia
 Pegao - Wisin & Yandel
 ¿Quién Me Iba a Decir? - David Bisbal
 Ser o Parecer - RBD

Favorite Tropical Artist
 Aventura
 Juan Luis Guerra
 Marc Anthony
 Olga Tañón
 Víctor Manuelle

CD to Die For
 Amar Es Combatir - Maná
 Celestial - RBD
 Habla El Corazón - Yuridia
 Los Vaqueros - Wisin & Yandel
 Premonición - David Bisbal

Favorite Urban Artist
 Daddy Yankee
 Don Omar
 Ivy Queen
 RKM & Ken-Y
 Wisin & Yandel

My Favorite Concert
 Maná
 RBD
 Ricky Martin
 Shakira
 Wisin & Yandel

Favorite Rock Star
 Alejandra Guzmán
 Belinda
 Juanes
 Maná
 Panda

Best Ballad
 Algún Día - RBD
 Amar es lo que quiero - David Bisbal
 Como Yo Nadie Te Ha Amado - Yuridia
 No, No, No - Thalía featuring Anthony "Romeo" Santos
 Tu Recuerdo - Ricky Martin featuring La Mari & Tommy Torres

Movie Category

Can He Act or What?
 Antonio Banderas - (Take the Lead)
 Christian Meier - (La Mujer de Mi Hermano)
 Diego Luna - (Sólo Dios Sabe)
 Gael García Bernal - (Babel)
 Kuno Becker - (Goal!)

Favorite Flick
 Babel
 Bandidas
 El Laberinto del Fauno
 La Mujer de Mi Hermano
 Volver

She Steals the Show
 Adriana Barraza (Babel)
 Ana de la Reguera (Nacho Libre)
 Bárbara Mori (La Mujer de Mi Hermano)
 Penélope Cruz (Bandidas & Volver)
 Salma Hayek (Bandidas)

Sports Category

Most Electrifying Male Player
 Cuauhtémoc Blanco (Club América)
 Guillermo Ochoa (Club América)
 Omar Bravo (Club Deportivo Guadalajara)
 Oswaldo Sánchez (Club Santos Laguna)
 Rafael Márquez Álvarez (FC Barcelona)

I'm a Die Hard Fan of...
 Club América
 Club Deportivo Guadalajara
 New York Yankees
 Selección Mexicana de Futbol
 Pumas Dorados de la UNAM

Most Electryfing Female Player
 Ana Guevara (400 meters)
 Lorena Ochoa (Mexican Golfer)
 Maribel Domínguez (Soccer player)
 Milka Duno (Race car driver)
 Sofía Mulánovich (Peruvian surfer)

Promising New Player
 Andrés Guardado (Club Atlas de Guadalajara)
 Giovani dos Santos (FC Barcelona B)
 José Reyes (New York Mets)
 José Juan Barea (Dallas Mavericks)
 Juan Carlos Mosqueda (Club América)

Fashion and Image Category

She's Got Style
 Anahí
 Dulce María
 Jennifer Lopez
 Ninel Conde
 Thalía

Girl of My Dreams
 Anahí
 Dulce María
 Jennifer Lopez
 Ninel Conde
 Thalía

He's Got Style
 Alfonso Herrera
 Chayanne
 Christopher Uckermann
 Daddy Yankee
 Luis Fonsi

Supermodel
 Adriana Lima
 Amelia Vega
 Dayanara Torres
 Gisele Bündchen
 Sissi

What a Hottie!
 Alfonso Herrera
 Chayanne
 Christopher Uckermann
 Daddy Yankee
 Ricky Martin

Pop Culture Category

My Idol is...
 Anahí
 Dulce María
 Shakira
 Thalía
 Ricky Martin

Paparazi's Favorite Target
 Anahí
 Jennifer Lopez
 Luis Miguel
 RBD
 Paulina Rubio

References

External links 
Premios Juventud
 Premios Juventud Official Site  

Premios Juventud
Premios Juventud
Premios Juventud
Premios Juventud
Premios Juventud
Premios Juventud
Premios Juventud
2000s in Miami